Richibucto Bears were a Canadian Junior ice hockey team from Richibucto, New Brunswick. The Bears played in the New Brunswick Junior B Hockey League and New Brunswick Junior C Hockey League and were the 1999 Don Johnson Cup Maritime Junior B Champions.

History
Founded in the 1990s, the Bears were a member of the old New Brunswick Junior B Hockey League. In 2003, the league folded and Richibucto was forced to play down in the New Brunswick Junior C Hockey League until the team folded in 2008. However, the Richibucto Bears is the name many teams from Richibucto were known as from the early 1970s. They had Jr. B Teams playing prior to the "1990s" as stated in the opening sentence. In fact the Juvenile team in 1979 won the New Brunswick Provincial title and went on to represent the province in the Atlantic Championship held in Mt Pearl NFLD. The team ended up losing in the finals to St John's, a team they had beaten earlier in the tournament.

The Bears were 1997, 1998, and 1999 New Brunswick Junior B Champions. The 1997 Don Johnson Cup Maritime Junior C Championship saw the Bears finish the round robin with a 1-2-0 record. With a win over either of Nova Scotia's Cape Breton Alpines or Windsor Royals the Bears would have played for the Cup in the Final, but after losing to each team by two goals they and the Island Junior Hockey League's Sherwood-Parkdale Kings were out in the cold. In 1998, the Bears made it all the way to the Don Johnson Cup final against the Windsor Royals of the Nova Scotia Junior Hockey League but lost 4-2. In 1999, at the Don Johnson Cup, they were able to win the final 10-2 against the Bell Island Jr. Blues of the St. John's Junior Hockey League and clinch their only Maritime Junior B Championship. The Bears were the first and still one of only two teams from New Brunswick to have ever won the Don Johnson Cup (the other being the now Junior A Woodstock Slammers).

Junior B hockey in New Brunswick collapsed in 2003. The Bears survived as members of the New Brunswick Junior C Hockey League for five seasons before folding in 2008.

In 2010, the Bears attempted to return to the NBJCHL but were too late to form an entry. They kept practicing together and mid-season a team folded from the league and the Bears got their chance.  Despite only playing 5 regular season games, the Bears ended up winning the league playoffs and a berth into the 2011 Maritime-Hockey North Junior C Championships. At the tournament in Church Point, Nova Scotia, the Bears started out with a 5-1 win over the Charlottetown Abbies of the Prince Edward Island Junior C Hockey League.  They then beat the Kivalliq Canucks of Hockey North 6-3. They dropped their third game 9-3 to the host Clare Lions and their fourth 8-2 to the Eastern Shore Jr. Mariners of the Nova Scotia Junior C Hockey League. After a tournament record of 2-2-0, the Bears earned a berth into the semi-finals where they were dropped again by Eastern Shore 9-5.

In the summer of 2011, junior hockey in New Brunswick all but collapsed and the Bears again were a victim of it.

Season-by-season record

External links
Official Hockey News Site in Atlantic Canada

Ice hockey teams in New Brunswick